Joseph Parkinson (born 11 June 1971) is an English football coach and former professional player.

As a player, Parkinson played in the Premier League for Everton, while with the club he won the FA Cup in 1995. He also played in the Football League for Wigan Athletic and AFC Bournemouth making a total of 239 league appearances, scoring 10 goals during a ten-year career.

After working away from the sport for a number of years, he returned to football in 2012 and was an academy coach at Wigan Athletic, he was promoted to assistant manager under Gary Caldwell and later joined Bury in a similar position. He has since held various roles on the coaching staff's of AFC Fylde, Shrewsbury Town and Hartlepool United.

Playing career
After stints in the lower leagues with Wigan Athletic and AFC Bournemouth the combative midfielder was signed by managerless Everton on 28 December 1993 for £250,000, between the resignation of Howard Kendall and arrival of Mike Walker. While at the Premier League side he made 107 appearances, scoring 4 goals.

He became a fans' favourite at the club, playing a major part in Joe Royle's "Dogs of War" Everton team. Most memorably he won an FA Cup winner's medal when Everton defeated Manchester United in the 1995 Final.

In April 1997, Parkinson broke down after battling a knee injury most of the season, and was ruled out for the remainder of the 1996–97 season as well as the entire 1997–98 season. Parkinson was unable to return to full fitness. Complications with the injury, including 2 surgeries and a further full season out of the game (1998–99) resulted in Parkinson retiring from football in November 1999, when only 28. This came two years after his last appearance. Despite the relatively small number of appearances he made, his contribution and commitment was recognised with a testimonial against Manchester City in 2000.

Coaching career
After a spell out of the game, Parkinson took up the role of youth team coach at Wigan Athletic in 2012. Joe moved from coaching the youth team to working with the first team under Gary Caldwell who won the 2015–16 Football League One title and were promoted to the Championship. In 2017, he was appointed assistant manager at Bury working under Chris Lucketti. However, following a poor run of form both his and Lucketti's contracts were terminated in January 2018.

In April 2018, Parkinson joined National League side AFC Fylde as the Lead Academy Coach. In July 2017, Parkinson moved to Shrewsbury Town where he became the club's assistant manager.

In November 2019, Parkinson left his role at Shrewsbury to take up the position of assistant manager at Hartlepool United. The role saw him link up with Dave Challinor who he had worked with previously at Fylde. Parkinson left the club in August 2021 due to health and family reasons. He described Hartlepool's promotion to League Two in the 2020–21 season as one of the biggest achievements in his career.

Personal life
Parkinson was on Sky Sports show "Where Are They Now" in May 2008 where he was shown to be working as a forklift driver at "Smith Bateson". He said he got a normal day job because he just got so bored being at home all the time. Parkinson re-surfaced in a coaching role with Wigan Athletic in 2012, progressing from working with the youth team to first team coach.

In an interview for the BBC in October 2011, Joey Barton said that Joe Parkinson is his favourite footballer of all time.

Honours
FA Cup: Winners, 1995
FA Charity Shield: Winners, 1995

References

External links
 Joe Parkinson Career Stats at Soccerbase
  Sunday Times article 25 May 2009

1971 births
Living people
People from Eccles, Greater Manchester
English footballers
Association football midfielders
Wigan Athletic F.C. players
AFC Bournemouth players
Everton F.C. players
Premier League players
Wigan Athletic F.C. non-playing staff
Bury F.C. non-playing staff
Shrewsbury Town F.C. non-playing staff
Hartlepool United F.C. non-playing staff
FA Cup Final players